

Adam Sedgwick and Roderick Murchison 
In 1835, Adam Sedgwick began naming the Cambrian System, "recognizing the first rich assemblage of fossils in the rock record". Roderick Murchison names the Silurian system in the same year. He believes that (not accurately) that the Silurian era predates any fossils of land plants and consequently any "economically valuable coal seams". In later years, Murchison and Sedgwick would have many a heated debate over the priority of these systems.

See also 

 1835

References

1830s in paleontology
Paleontology